Ribes amarum is a species of currant known by the common name bitter gooseberry. It is endemic to California, where it is known from mountains,  foothills, and canyons. Its habitat includes Chaparral.

Description
Ribes amarum is a shrub growing to one to two meters (40-80 inches) in height. Nodes along the stem each bear three spines up to a centimeter (0.4 inch) in length. The hairy, glandular leaves are 2 to 4 centimeters (0.8-1.6 inches) long and generally rounded in shape, divided into 3 to 5 rounded toothed lobes.

The inflorescence is a solitary flower or raceme of up to three flowers which hang from leaf axils. The showy flower has five pointed sepals in shades of purple-red which are reflexed upward. At the center is a tubular corolla of white or pink-tinged petals around five stamens and two styles. The fruit is a bristly berry up to 2 centimeters wide which is bright red, ripening purple.

References

External links
Jepson Manual Treatment — Ribes amarum
Ribes amarum — Calphotos Photo gallery, University of California

amarum
Endemic flora of California
Natural history of the California chaparral and woodlands
Natural history of the California Coast Ranges
Natural history of the Channel Islands of California
Natural history of the Peninsular Ranges
Natural history of the San Francisco Bay Area
Natural history of the Santa Monica Mountains
Natural history of the Transverse Ranges
Plants described in 1894
Flora without expected TNC conservation status